Warm Your Heart is a 1991 album released by American R&B/soul singer Aaron Neville. It features the singles "Everybody Plays the Fool", "Somewhere, Somebody" and "Close Your Eyes". The "Close Your Eyes" single also featured album producer Linda Ronstadt on guest vocals. The pair had previously collaborated on the songs "Don't Know Much", "All My Life" and "When Something Is Wrong with My Baby".

Musicians 
The album utilises many guest vocalists, musicians and session musicians. Producer Linda Ronstadt sings on four songs on the album and Grammy Award winning Rita Coolidge sings on three. Other guests include slide guitarist Ry Cooder, saxophonist Plas Johnson, Bob Seger, Dr. John, Bob Glaub and Dean Parks.

Critical reception

Reception at the time of release was generally good. In their four-star review Rolling Stone said that Neville "must have taken the meaning of the gospel deep into his heart". The New York Times review stated that the "solo album debut of the great New Orleans soul singer has the year's most sublime pop vocals".
The album reached number 44 on the American Billboard 200 album chart, and achieved platinum status. In Canada, the album reached number 25 in the Album Charts and achieved gold status.

Track listing

Personnel
Aaron Neville - vocals
Brian Stoltz - guitar (tracks 1,3,5-11)
Bob Glaub - bass (tracks 3-5,8)
Tony Hall - bass (tracks 1,6,9,10)
Don Grolnick - keyboards, piano (tracks 1,3,5-7,9-11)
Carlos Vega - drums (tracks 1,3,5-10,14)
with:
Linda Ronstadt - duet on "Close Your Eyes", soprano vocals on "Ave Maria", whistling on "Everybody Plays the Fool"
Rita Coolidge - duet on "La Vie Dansante"
Jason Neville - rap on "Angola Bound"
Ry Cooder - guitar, slide guitar on "It Feels Like Rain"
Dean Parks, David Lindley, Larry Carlton - guitar
Jimmy Johnson, Daryl Johnson - bass
Robbie Buchanan - Hammond B-3 organ
Dr. John - piano, percussion
Russ Kunkel - drums, programming
Willie Green - drums
Bob Seger - percussion, backing vocals
Cyril Neville - congas
Plas Johnson - tenor saxophone
Arnold McCuller, Donny Gerrard, Linda Ronstadt, Renée Armand, Rita Coolidge, Rosemary Butler, Willie Greene Jr., Bobby King, Valerie Carter - backing vocals
Van Dyke Parks - arrangement on "Louisiana 1927"
David Campbell - arranger and conductor on "Ave Maria"
Technical
George Massenburg - recording, mixing
Chuck Beeson - art direction, design
John Casado - photography

Charts

References

Aaron Neville albums
1991 albums
A&M Records albums
albums arranged by David Campbell (composer)
albums produced by George Massenburg